Thomas Wilton (active from 1288 to 1322) was an English theologian and scholastic philosopher, a pupil of Duns Scotus, a teacher at the University of Oxford and then the University of Paris, where he taught Walter Burley. He was a Fellow of Merton College from about 1288.

He attacked some of Burley's theses. He wrote on and rejected the theory of motion of Averroes, provoking a reply by John of Jandun. In discussing the eternity of the world, he connects the views of Maimonides and Aquinas.

References
Lauge O. Nielsen, The Debate between Peter Auriol and Thomas Wylton on Theology and Virtue, Vivarium, Volume 38, Number 1, 2000, 35-98
Cecilia Trifogli, Thomas Wylton on Final Causality, in Alexander Fidora (editor), Erfahrung und Beweis: Die Wissenschaften Von Der Natur Im 13. und 14. Jahrhundert (2007)

Notes

English theologians
Scholastic philosophers
Year of birth unknown
Fellows of Merton College, Oxford
13th-century births
14th-century deaths
14th-century philosophers